George Bogle may refer to:

 George Bogle of Daldowie (1700–1784), Glasgow merchant
 George Bogle (diplomat) (1746–1781), his son, first British diplomat to visit Tibet